Will Hickey is an Irish rugby union player, currently playing for United Rugby Championship side Ospreys. His preferred position is flanker.

Ospreys
Hickey signed for the Ospreys in March 2021, having previously been a member of the  academy. Hickey was made his debut in Round 3 of the 2021–22 European Rugby Champions Cup in the match against .

References

External links
itsrugby profile

Living people
Irish rugby union players
Ospreys (rugby union) players
Rugby union flankers
Year of birth missing (living people)